Charlie Lee (born 5 January 1987) is an English professional football coach and former player, who played as a defender or midfielder. He is an academy coach at EFL League Two club Leyton Orient.

Playing career

Tottenham Hotspur
Born in Whitechapel, London, Lee started his career with the Tottenham Hotspur youth system in 2003. He signed a professional contract with the club in July 2005. He appeared on the first team bench for the first time in the UEFA Cup tie against Slavia Prague on 28 September 2006 and also appeared as an unused substitute against Sporting Braga, a match which Tottenham won 3–2. Lee was also an unused sub for a handful of top flight fixtures.

On 18 November, Lee played his first game for Millwall in their 2–2 draw with Doncaster Rovers, filling in for the injured Richard Shaw.

He was released from his contract by Tottenham on 19 May 2007.

Peterborough United
Lee completed a move to Peterborough United on 23 May, signing a three-year contract. He has played the majority of his games for them in centre midfield, scoring eight goals in the 2007–08 season and was named the club's player of the year.

In the 2008–09 season, Lee played the majority of the time anywhere along the back four. On 25 April, he scored the only goal in the 1–0 win against Colchester United which paired with the 1–0 defeat of Milton Keynes Dons by Walsall at the stadium:mk promoted the club to the Championship. He won the club's player of the year award for the second successive year.

Gillingham
He re-joined Gillingham, on a three-year contract, in July 2011. He was released by the club at the end of the 2013–14 season.

Stevenage
Lee signed for newly relegated League Two club Stevenage on 12 July 2014.

Yeovil Town
Following promotion with Leyton Orient to League Two, Lee was released at the end of the 2018–19 season. He signed for Yeovil Town on 13 August 2019 as a free transfer, on a one-year contract. At the end of the 2020–21 season, Lee left Yeovil Town following the expiry of his contract.

Billericay Town
After expressing a desire to move closer to home, Lee signed for National League South side Billericay Town ahead of the 2021–22 season.

Lee announced his retirement from playing, due to recurring injury, on 3 December 2021.

Coaching career

Yeovil Town
On 17 February 2022, Lee returned to National League side Yeovil Town as assistant manager, signing a short-term contract the move reunited Lee with his former manager Darren Sarll. On 28 March 2022, after manager Darren Sarll left Yeovil for Woking, Lee was installed as Yeovil's caretaker manager. On 13 May 2022, Lee left the club with a game of the National League season remaining.

Career statistics

Player

Managerial

Honours

Player
Peterborough United
Football League Two runner-up: 2007–08
Football League One runner-up: 2008–09
Football League One play-offs: 2011

Gillingham
Football League Two: 2012–13

Leyton Orient
National League: 2018–19
FA Trophy runner-up: 2018–19

Manager
Yeovil Town
Somerset Premier Cup: 2021–22

References

External links

1987 births
Living people
Footballers from Whitechapel
English footballers
Association football defenders
Association football midfielders
Association football coaches
English football managers
Tottenham Hotspur F.C. players
Millwall F.C. players
Peterborough United F.C. players
Gillingham F.C. players
Stevenage F.C. players
Leyton Orient F.C. players
Yeovil Town F.C. players
Billericay Town F.C. players
English Football League players
National League (English football) players
Yeovil Town F.C. non-playing staff
Yeovil Town F.C. managers
National League (English football) managers